Oliver James Roberts (born 23 September 1996) is an English professional footballer who plays as a midfielder for Atherton Collieries.

Club career
After joining Stoke City from Stockport County in 2012, Roberts spent three years in the Stoke academy before joining Tamworth on loan in October 2015. On 3 October 2015, Roberts made his Tamworth debut in Tamworth's 2–0 away defeat against Curzon Ashton, replacing Paul Green at half time. Roberts went onto make five more appearances for Tamworth before being recalled by Stoke in November 2015.

On 22 August 2016, Roberts joined League One side Fleetwood Town on a one-year deal with an option of an extra twelve months. On 9 November 2016, Roberts made his Fleetwood Town debut in an EFL Trophy tie against Carlisle United, in which Fleetwood suffered a 4–2 defeat. On 18 May 2017, it was announced that Roberts would leave Fleetwood upon the expiry of his contract in June 2017.

On 4 August 2017, following his release from Fleetwood, Roberts joined Northern Premier League Premier Division side Stalybridge Celtic. Just over a week later, he made his debut for Stalybridge Celtic during their 1–0 home victory over Nantwich Town, featuring for 80 minutes before being replaced by Lassana Mendes.

In July 2018, Roberts joined Mickleover Sports after spending time in the National Premier Soccer League with New Orleans Jesters. In December 2018, Roberts joined Atherton Collieries.

On 30 June 2022, Roberts returned to Atherton Collieries.

Career statistics

References

1996 births
Living people
Footballers from Ashton-under-Lyne
English footballers
Association football midfielders
Stockport County F.C. players
Stoke City F.C. players
Tamworth F.C. players
Fleetwood Town F.C. players
Stalybridge Celtic F.C. players
New Orleans Jesters players
Mickleover Sports F.C. players
Buxton F.C. players
Atherton Collieries A.F.C. players
Trafford F.C. players
Colne F.C. players
English Football League players
National Premier Soccer League players
Northern Premier League players
English expatriate footballers
Expatriate soccer players in the United States
English expatriate sportspeople in the United States